Tougher Than Leather is an American film released in 1988 and distributed by New Line Cinema. The film was directed by Rick Rubin and stars the hip-hop group Run–D.M.C. They created the film to coincide with the release of their fourth studio album also titled Tougher Than Leather.

Plot
At the beginning of the film, D.M.C. is released from prison, at which time he returns to New York City with his band-mates, Run and Jam Master Jay. They are ready to schedule some gigs and kick-start their musical careers when things take a dark turn. Their friend Runny Ray, played by Raymond White, has been murdered by Vic Ferrante (Rick Rubin); this pulls the group into a seedy world of crime and violence. Vic and the police cover up the murder to look like Ray died from drugs. As the band members attempt to determine who is responsible for the murder, their own lives become endangered. They take matters into their own hands trying to find Ray's killer. However, the action is balanced with a series of musical performances by the stars and other late 1980s hip-hop stars including Slick Rick and Beastie Boys.

Cast
 Darryl McDaniels as "D.M.C."
 Joseph Simmons as "Run"
 Jason Mizell as Jay "Jam Master Jay"
 Richard Edson as Bernie Carteez
 Rick Rubin as Vic Ferrante
 Jenny Lumet as Pam
 Russell Simmons as himself
 Adam Yauch as himself
 Mike D as himself
 Adam Horovitz as himself
 Slick Rick as himself
 Vic Noto as Steve, The Bartender

Critical reaction and release
While the music usually garners a favorable response, critics generally panned the film. According to The Washington Post,  the film is "vile, vicious, despicable, stupid, sexist, racist and horrendously made." It was also described as "poorly executed and exploitative fare." It carried a 43% rating at Rotten Tomatoes.

The film failed at the box office, but was released on VHS. It is now out of print.

Connections to Blaxploitation

In response to the negative reactions to the film, critics like Randall Clark have pointed out the many connections between the movie and the history of the "Blaxploitation" genre. Much like earlier films such as Shaft and Black Samson, the plot features inner-city anti-heroes who need to take the law into their own hands as they have been neglected by the more traditional avenues of justice.

References

External links
 

1988 films
Run-DMC
1980s hip hop films
Hood films
New Line Cinema films
1980s English-language films
1980s American films